B.O.L.T is a Japanese girl idol group managed by Stardust Promotion. It was formed in 2019 with five members, 3 of them were former members of Rock A Japonica:Luna Naitō, Chiho Takai, and Misato Hirase.

The group debuted on July 15, 2019 with their first performance being at the "EVIL A LIVE 2019" festival. Their debut was followed with performances at events such as the 2019 Tokyo Idol Festival, the 2019 Gyu Agricultural festival, and the NewYear Platinum Party 2020.

Members

Former members

Timeline

Discography

Singles

Albums

Videography

Music videos

References 

Japanese girl groups
Child musical groups
Japanese-language singers
Musical groups established in 2019
Stardust Promotion artists
Japanese idol groups
Japanese pop music groups
Vocal quintets
2019 establishments in Japan
Musical groups from Tokyo